V1315 Aquilae is a cataclysmic variable star in the north of the equatorial constellation of Aquila. It is in the sub-set of nova-like (NL) variables, specifically a SW Sextantis star (a type of white dwarf-donor star pair). These were characterized as having non-magnetic white dwarfs – thus that do not undergo dwarf-nova bright luminations ("eruptions"). There is countering evidence for some magnetism. Being a SW Sextantis star, V1315 Aquilae has a high rate of mass transfer, so it is in steady-state accretion and in a constant state of outburst. It emits most of its light in the visible range, and this comes from the accretion disk. The eclipse depth is 1.8 mag. No description of the donor star is made.

Nova shell 
V1315 Aquilae has a roughly spherical shell of material around it with a maximal  solar masses ( ), which is too small to be any starburst nebula or more advanced supernova remnant. It is consistent with models of a remnant of a nova-scale eruption roughly 500 to 1200 years old (that is, plus the time for the light from this system to travel to the Earth). V1315 Aquilae is the first nova-like system to have been discovered with a nova shell.

References 

White dwarfs
Aquila (constellation)
Nova-like variables
Cataclysmic variable stars
Eclipsing binaries
Aquilae, V1215